Mi-ran is a Korean feminine given name. The meaning differs based on the hanja used to write each syllable of the name. There are 33 hanja with the reading "mi" and 11 hanja with the reading "ran" on the South Korean government's official list of hanja which may be registered for use in given names. One common way of writing this name in hanja means "beautiful orchid".

People with this name include:
Ra Mi-ran (born 1975), South Korean actress
Hong Mi-ran (born 1977), South Korean television screenwriter, one of the Hong sisters
Jang Mi-ran (born 1983), South Korean weightlifter
Jung Mi-ran (born 1985), South Korean basketball player

See also
List of Korean given names

References

Korean feminine given names